is a 2015 Japanese animated family comedy film directed by , produced by Nippon Animation and based on the manga series Chibi Maruko-chan written and illustrated by Momoko Sakura. It was released in Japan by Toho on December 23, 2015.

Cast
Tarako as Momoko "Maruko" Sakura
Yusaku Yara as Hiroshi Sakura
Teiyū Ichiryūsai as Sumire Sakura
Yūko Mizutani as Sakiko Sakura
Bin Shimada as Tomozō Sakura
Yūko Sasaki as Kotake Sakura
Nobuo Tobita as Sueo Maruo
Masami Kikuchi as Kazuhiko Hanawa
Naoko Watanabe as Tamae "Tama" Honami
Tomoko Naka as Shigeru Fujiki
Taishi Nakagawa as Andrea
Hitori Gekidan as Singh
Papaya Suzuki as Nepu
Naomi Watanabe as Julia
Rola as Xin-ni

Reception
As of January 17, 2016, the film has grossed  in Japan.

The film was released in China on September 23, 2016, where it grossed  so far.

References

External links

2015 comedy films
2010s Japanese films
2015 anime films
Animated comedy films
Anime films based on manga
Comedy anime and manga
Japanese comedy films
Nippon Animation films
Toho animated films
Chibi Maruko-chan